Léon Breitling (27 January 1860 – 11 August 1914) was a Swiss watchmaker and a businessman, founder of the watch manufacturing company Breitling SA in Saint-Imier in 1884.

Career overview
Léon Breitling was born in 1860. His interest in watchmaking started at a very young age leading young Léon to initiate his first internship still as a teenager, a pursuit which would change the course of his life.

In 1884 at the age of 24 years old he established his first business venture, the watchmaking company "G Leon Breitling" in Saint-Imier (Bernese Jura).
L. Breitling founded his manufacture producing complicated watches, chronographs and chronometric instruments.

In 1892, Léon Breitling moved his company to La Chaux-de-Fonds to larger production facilities, renaming the brand "Leon G. Breitling Montbrillant SA Watch Factory" and eventually growing the business to 60 employees.

Accomplishments
L. Breitling built one of the most famous Swiss watch companies in history both in popular acclaim and annual revenues.

Breitling remained privately owned and its management was kept within the Breitling family until 1979.

Ernst Schneider bought the company from the founding Breitling family in 1979 and his family retained ownership until April 2017.

Ernst's son, Theodore Schneider, sold the majority stake (80%) in Breitling to CVC Capital Partners for over $870m. Theodore Schneider retained 20% control of Breitling until November 2018, when he sold these remaining 20% to CVC.

Personal life 
Léon Breitling was born in 1860 and died in 1914 in Switzerland.

He married and had 1 child, Gaston Breitling, to whom he passed on his company Breitling.

References

Books 

 Breitling Highlights - by Henning Mützlitz, 2011  
 Breitling: The History of a Great Brand of Watches (1884 – present) 
 Breitling. Die Geschichte einer großen Uhrenmarke. 1884 bis heute; Author: Benno Richter; 
 Das ZEITGEFÜHL-Uhrenbuch; Author: Gerd-Lothar Reschke; 

Swiss watchmakers (people)
Swiss businesspeople
1860 births
1914 deaths